Stuart Vyse is an American psychologist, teacher, speaker and author who specializes in belief in superstitions and critical thinking. He is frequently invited as a speaker and interviewed by the media as an expert on superstitious behavior. His book Believing in Magic: The Psychology of Superstition won the American Psychological Association's William James Book Award.

Education and teaching

Vyse earned his B.A. and M.A. in English at Southern Illinois University Carbondale. He went on to an M.A. and a Ph.D. in psychology at the University of Rhode Island. He taught at Connecticut College from 1987 to 2015, where he has been Joanne Toor Cummings '50 Professor. He also taught at Providence College and the University of Rhode Island. He mentions that living near the campus of the University of Illinois Urbana-Champaign, where his mother was completing a college degree, probably spurred his interest in academia.

Vyse has served on the editorial board of The Analysis of Verbal Behavior, The Behavior Analyst and The Psychological Record. He has been on the editorial board of Skeptic Magazine since 1997, and since 2015 he has written the “Behavior & Belief” column for Skeptical Inquirer magazine, where he is also a contributing editor.  Vyse is also a contributor to a website dedicated to educating parents and others about the scientifically discredited Facilitated Communication technique.

He holds fellowships in two organizations: The Association for Psychological Science and the Committee for Skeptical Inquiry  where he also serves on the CSI Executive Council. He cites Carl Sagan and Stephen Jay Gould as influences in his role as science communicator.

As of 2022, Vyse has been living in Stonington, Connecticut for two decades, in a building that used to be called the Steamboat Hotel, a landmark of historical value in the community. His research into the building's past and its successive inhabitants became the basis of a book, which is due to be released in October, 2022.

Superstition and critical thinking
Vyse is frequently sought after by the American news media to explain why people believe in superstitions and how people make financial decisions.
Vyse believes superstitions come from a need to have some measure of control over events people hope will happen, or seek to avoid. This behavior is reinforced by the tendency of the human brain to detect patterns in events, even when they're completely due to chance. That motivates people to attribute a favorable outcome to a good-luck charm, for instance. Finding a way to control the outcome of an uncertain situation brings some comfort. While this behavior may help reduce anxiety, it may also cause people to gamble excessively, to base decisions on unreliable techniques such as fortune-telling or to endanger their health, for example by using homeopathy rather than actual medication.

Vyse suspects superstition may be on the rise, due to a large amount of false information circulating on the internet and insufficient critical thinking skills: "There's a willingness to accept almost anything, which is unfortunate, and promotes superstition". As a skeptic, he has been advocating for public policies based on science and has been critical of populist heads of state such as Donald Trump and Jair Bolsonaro.

He used to teach a college-level seminar on critical thinking, logical fallacies and debate argumentation. He has been critical of medical treatments and techniques based on pseudoscience, such as facilitated communication.

Remarking that superstitions are often passed on from parents to their children, Vyse stated that his family, who were Protestant, did not indulge in superstition when he was growing up and he was never superstitious himself.

Books and book chapters
 
 
 
 
 
 
 
Vyse was awarded the 1999 William James Book Award by the American Psychological Association for Believing in Magic.

Selected journal publications

Other publications

References

External links
 Stuart Vyse's Researchgate profile.
 Stuart Vyse's TEDx talk "A Mind at Play".
 Facilitated Communication, where Vyse contributes.

1950 births
Living people
Critics of alternative medicine
University of Rhode Island alumni
21st-century American psychologists
Evanston, Illinois
Southern Illinois University alumni
Connecticut College people
20th-century American psychologists